Udupa is a surname. Notable people with the surname include:
Archana Udupa (born 1983), Indian singer
Giridhar Udupa (born 1980), Indian percussionist
H. V. K. Udupa (1921–2003), Indian physical chemist
Jayaram K. Udupa, Indian-American radiologist
K. N. Udupa (1920–1992), Indian surgeon
Sahana Udupa, Indian media anthropologist

Indian surnames